Kholkovo is a rural locality (a village) in Denyatinskoye Rural Settlement, Melenkovsky District, Vladimir Oblast, Russia. The population was 5 as of 2010. There are 2 streets.

Geography 
Kholkovo is located 41 km northeast of Melenki (the district's administrative centre) by road. Gorodishchi is the nearest rural locality.

References 

Rural localities in Melenkovsky District